The 1988–1989 Highland Football League was won by Peterhead. Fort William finished bottom.

Teams

Table

Highland Football League seasons
Highland